The 1936 Soviet Cup Final was a football match that took place at the Dynamo Stadium, Moscow on August 28, 1936. The match was the first Soviet Cup final and it was contested by Lokomotiv Moscow and Dinamo Tbilisi. At one point the competition was decided to be the Soviet championship by the Olympic system of elimination, but later it was decided to keep the already existing championship and create a new one called the Cup of the Supreme Council of Fitness and Sport.

Road to Final 

The clubs of the Top League Group A as well as Group B had to start from the second round of the competition.

Match details

See also
 1936 Soviet Top League

References

External links 
 Calendar of the competition
 Calendar of the competition

1936
Cup
Soviet Cup Final 1936
Soviet Cup Final 1936
August 1936 sports events
1936 in Moscow